Paracercion melanotum, Eastern Lilysquatter, is a species of damselfly in the family Coenagrionidae. It is known to occur in China, Hong Kong, Taiwan, South Korea, Japan, Vietnam, India, Sri Lanka, Nepal, Java, Philippines and Thailand.

Taxonomy
Species delimitation study based on COI, ITS, and morphological evidence concluded that P. pendulum and P. malayanum were synonymized as junior synonyms of P. melanotum.

Description and habitat
It is a medium sized damselfly with deep blue eyes. Its thorax is black on dorsum with very broad azure blue antehumeral stripes, which are very narrow or missing in Paracercion calamorum. Lateral sides of thorax are blue with a fine black line on the upper part of each lateral suture. No pruinescence compared to P. calamorum. Its wings are transparent and pterostigma is yellow, framed with heavy black nervures. Its abdomen is azure blue with broad black dorsal marks up to segment 7. Segment 2 has a distinct broad dorsal spot shaped like a thistle-head connected narrowly to a fine apical ring. This mark will help to distinguish it from Pseudagrion species. Segment 10 has a narrow mid-dorsal black streak. Female is dull green in colors. Its abdomen is similar to the male. But the lateral ground colour is yellowish red and segments 8 and 9 are broadly black on dorsum. Segment 10 is blue only in the apical border.

It breeds in shallow lakes, ponds and paddy fields in the lowland, perches on the floating vegetation.

See also 
 List of odonates of India
 List of odonata of Kerala

References 

 Thai Odonata
 Query Results
 Animal Diversity Web
 India Biodiversity Portal

External links 

Coenagrionidae
Insects described in 1876